Magic Kingdom: Ang Alamat ng Damortis is a 1997 Philippine fantasy adventure film directed by Peque Gallaga and Lore Reyes. The film stars Jason Salcedo, Janus del Prado, Junell Hernando and Jun Urbano. It was one of the entries in the 1997 Metro Manila Film Festival, where it won as 3rd Best Picture. It marks the theatrical debut of Anne Curtis.

It is a sequel to the 1996 film Magic Temple. A sequel Magikland was released in 2020.

The film is streaming online on YouTube.

Cast
 Jason Salcedo as Jobert
 Janus del Prado as Oman
 Junell Hernando as Samuel
 Jun Urbano as Amain
 Mark Gil as Basilicus
 William Martinez as Gabriel
 Ramon Christopher as Rava
 Turko Cervantes as Gaman
 Maricel Laxa as Empress Sofia
 Anne Curtis as Dahlia
 Jomari Uy as Mico
 Mark Querubin as Woodcutter
 Lilia Cuntapay as Wormkeeper
 Mark Bacho as Nervous Creature

Production
Kung Nandiayn Ka Lang, sung by Antoinette Taus, was the theme song for the film.

Awards

References

External links

Full Movie on Viva Films

1997 films
1997 fantasy films
1990s fantasy adventure films
Filipino-language films
Philippine fantasy adventure films
Films directed by Peque Gallaga
Films directed by Lore Reyes
Neo Films films